Prasat Muang Tam is a Khmer Hindu Temple in Prakhon Chai District, Buriram Province, Thailand. It is primarily in the Khleang and Baphuon styles, which dates its primary phases of construction to the late-10th and early-11th centuries. The primary deity was Shiva, although Vishnu was also worshipped there.

Like most Hindu temples, Muang Tam is oriented towards the east. It has a flat concentric plan, with a central sanctuary and two surrounded successively by an inner enclosure, ponds, and an outer enclosure. The ponds between the enclosures are an unusual feature of the temple, as is the central sanctuary, which is not elevated and has its towers arranged in rows of three and two. All the towers except the central one have been restored.

Kala are particularly prominent in the lintels of the temple. They are the best available aid in dating the structure, but the mix of styles (Khleang and Baphuon) makes accurate dating impossible. Several of the lintels on the outer gopuras are unfinished.

A small probably contemporaneous with the temple, lay to the east, while a later, larger baray survives further north between Muang Tam and Phanom Rung.

References
 Freeman, Michael. A Guide to Khmer Temples in Thailand and Laos.  Weatherhill, 1998.

External links
 The Official Website of Muangtam Sanctuary (Muangtum Temple)

Angkorian sites in Thailand
Former populated places in Thailand
10th-century Hindu temples
Buildings and structures in Buriram province
Tourist attractions in Buriram province

km:ប្រាសាទមឿងតាំ